Faulx is a commune located in the Meurthe-et-Moselle department in north-eastern France.

Faulx may also refer to:
 Faulx-les-Tombes, a village of Wallonia in the province of Namur, Belgium
 Faulx-les-Tombes Castle, château in the Belgian village
 La Chapelle-du-Bois-des-Faulx, a commune in the Eure department in northern France
 Wavrechain-sous-Faulx, French commune of the Nord department
 French destroyer Faulx, a Bouclier-class destroyer built for the French Navy in 1911

See also
 Folx-les-Caves, village in Wallonia
 Faux (disambiguation)